This is a round-up of the 2007 Sligo Senior Football Championship. Tourlestrane claimed their eighth title in this year, and fifth since 1994, defeating Eastern Harps in the final by two points, despite the absence of captain and star player Eamon O'Hara. The holders Curry fell to a surprisingly heavy defeat to outsiders St. John's in a quarter-final second replay.

Group stages

The Championship was contested by 15 teams, divided into four groups. The top two sides in each group advanced to the quarter-finals, with the remaining sides facing the Relegation playoffs to retain Senior status for 2008.

Group A

Group B

Group C

Group D

Quarterfinals

Semifinals

Last eight

Sligo Senior Football Championship Final

Relegation

The relegation playoffs saw Geevagh and Shamrock Gaels relegated, however the latter claimed that an oversight had been made, regarding the matter of points gained in the Championship itself being carried over into the playoff groups, which was not applied by the county's Activities Committee, but which the GAA's Official Guide stated should be the case. This case was successful, subsequently no team was relegated for the 2008 season, and the Championship restructuring was delayed as a result.

Group A

Group B

References

 Sligo Champion (Summer/Autumn 2007)
 Sligo Weekender (Summer/Autumn 2007)

Sligo Senior Football Championship
Sligo Senior Football Championship